The 1970 Columbia Lions football team represented Columbia University in the 1970 NCAA University Division football season. They were led by third-year head coach Frank Navarro and played their home games at Baker Field . They were a member of the Ivy League. They finished the season 3–6 overall 1–6 in Ivy League play to tie for sixth place.

Schedule

Roster

References

Columbia
Columbia Lions football seasons
Columbia Lions football